Frog jumping is a competitive pastime for humans in which frogs are entered into competitions to jump certain distances. Frog jumping contests are held in small communities scattered around the United States, as part of the folk culture.

Frog jumping was made famous in a short story "The Celebrated Jumping Frog of Calaveras County" by Mark Twain. An event, inspired by the Twain story, has been held annually in Angels Camp, in California's Calaveras County, since 1928, with other events held in Indiana, Illinois, Ohio, Washington, Maine, Missouri, Louisiana, New York, Wisconsin, and also in Manitoba, Canada.

With 4,000 contestants in 2007, the Calaveras County contest has imposed strict rules regulating the frog's welfare, including limiting the daily number of a frog's jumps and mandating the playing of calming music in their enclosures. Entering specimens of the California red-legged frog in the competition, since it is an endangered species, is illegal. (It is also illegal, and likewise considered poor sportsmanship, for any competing frog to be weighted down by any means, as the frog in the Twain story was by the stranger who cheated in the contest as described.)

Bibliography 
 USA Today article
 Celebrating, and Quarreling Over, Frogs

External links 

 The Celebrated Jumping Frog of Calaveras County
 Voa News
 St. Pierre Frog Follies, St. Pierre, Manitoba
 Vanderburgh County Fair, Indiana
 Green Camp Firefighters Barbecue Festival, Marion, Oh
 Frog Jump Festival, Valley City, Ohio
 Piscataquis Valley Fair Annual Frog Jumping Contest, Dover-Foxcroft, Me
 Corcoran YMCA Frog Jumping Contest, Hanford, Ca
 Hannibal, Missouri Jaycees
 Pemberville Fair, Pemberville, Ohio
 Ilion Days Frog Jumping Contest, Ilion, NY

Animal festival or ritual
Frogs